Rahjerd (also Romanized as Rāhjerd, Rāh Gerd, and Rāhgīrd) is a village in Rahjerd-e Sharqi Rural District, Salafchegan District, Qom County, Qom Province, Iran. At the 2006 census, its population was 335, in 120 families.

References 

Populated places in Qom Province